Chruszczewka may refer to the following places in Poland:

Chruszczewka Szlachecka
Chruszczewka Włościańska